Heizer is a surname. Notable people with the surname include:

Ken Heizer (1924-2011), American football player
Michael Heizer (born 1944), American artist
Miles Heizer (born 1994), American actor
Oscar S. Heizer (1868-1956), American diplomat
Radomír Heizer (born 1987), Slovak ice hockey player
Robert Heizer (1915-1979), American archaeologist

See also
Heizer, Kansas, a community in the United States
Der Heizer, a short story by Franz Kafka